The Prague Skate (sometimes titled Golden Skate; from 1994: Czech Skate) is an international figure skating competition. It was a senior event from the 1960s to 1997, usually held in November or December in Prague. Medals were awarded in the disciplines of men's singles, ladies' singles, and pair skating. Since 1999, it is organized in some years as part of the ISU Junior Grand Prix series.

Senior medalists

Men

Ladies

Pairs

Ice dancing

Junior medalists

References 

 
Figure skating competitions
Figure skating in the Czech Republic